Pteleon is a genus of leaf beetles in the family Chrysomelidae. There are at least three described species in Pteleon.

Species
These species belong to the genus Pteleon:
 Pteleon brevicornis (Jacoby, 1887)
 Pteleon pubescens Jacoby, 1892
 Pteleon semicaeruleus Jacoby, 1888

References

Further reading

 
 
 
 

Galerucinae
Articles created by Qbugbot
Chrysomelidae genera
Taxa named by Martin Jacoby